Greatest Hits: 1980–1994 is the RIAA Platinum-certified first greatest hits album released by American singer Aretha Franklin since she signed with Arista Records in 1980. It compiles her hits from 1980's Aretha through her most recent album at the time: 1991's What You See Is What You Sweat. The album was released in March 1994.

The album includes three new recordings, her rendition of "A Deeper Love", "Willing to Forgive", and "Honey", all of which are released as singles.

Track listing

Charts

Weekly charts

Year-end charts

Certifications and sales

References

External links
 hitparade.ch

1994 greatest hits albums
Aretha Franklin compilation albums
Arista Records compilation albums